Everton Carr (born 11 January 1961) is a former Antiguan footballer who played in the Football League for Leicester City, Halifax Town and Rochdale.

External links
 Everton Carr stats at Neil Brown stat site

Antigua and Barbuda footballers
English Football League players
1961 births
Living people
Leicester City F.C. players
Halifax Town A.F.C. players
Rochdale A.F.C. players
Nuneaton Borough F.C. players
Weymouth F.C. players
Bath City F.C. players
Barnet F.C. players
Aylesbury United F.C. players
Oadby Town F.C. players
Association football defenders